Ripley Guinness Rishi (formerly Har Parkash, born , India) holds a number of world records. He is most renowned for having over 200 world flags tattooed on his body, including 49 flags on his face and head. He also has 'Ripley's Believe It or Not' tattooed on his forehead and a map of the world on his abdomen.

Record attempts 
 Longest pizza delivery - 10,286 miles from Delhi to California to deliver a pizza to the Ripley's Believe It or Not museum in San Francisco.
 Oldest adopted person  - In 2001 Guinness Rishi adopted his brother-in-law Ravinder Kumar Vig, who became the oldest adopted person at 61 years old.
 Ketchup drinking - Drinking a bottle of ketchup in less than 40 seconds.
 Tallest sugar cube tower - 64 inches high.
Most straws in his mouth- 496 straws 
Most flags tattooed on his body - all world flags are tattooed on his body

Trivia 
Had all of his teeth removed for an attempt to fit 755 drinking straws into his mouth.

References

External links 
 Metro
 Hindustan Times

Living people
Indian entertainers
World record holders
1942 births